The following is a Mackerras pendulum for the 2014 Victorian state election.

The margins are notional figures, calculated by Antony Green for the Victorian Electoral Commission following a redistribution of Victoria's electoral boundaries in 2013. Four seats (Bellarine, Monbulk, Ripon and Yan Yean) are held by the Labor Party, but the redistributed boundaries have made them notionally Liberal-held.

"Very safe" seats require a swing of over 20 per cent to change, "safe" seats require a swing of 10 to 20 per cent to change, "fairly safe" seats require a swing of between 6 and 10 per cent, while "marginal" seats require a swing of less than 6 per cent.

See also
Post-election pendulum for the 2010 Victorian state election

References

Pendulums for Victorian state elections